Aleksa Šaponjić (Serbian Cyrillic: Алекса Шапоњић, born June 4, 1992), is a Serbian water polo player, and a member of the Serbia men's national water polo team. His first notable competition with his national team was the 2012 European Championship in Eindhoven, the outcome was a win. He currently attends the University of California, Berkeley and plays for the CA Golden Bears water polo team.

Club career
 2011– CA Golden Bears

National career

2012 Eindhoven
On January 21 in the fourth match of the European Championship, Šaponjić scored his first goal ever for his national team in professional competition match. It was in a routine victory against Romania 14–5. On 27 January Šaponjić scored a goal in a semifinal 12–8 victory over Italy. On 29 January, Šaponjić won the European Championship with his national team beating in the final Montenegro by 9–8. This was his first medal with the national team.

Šaponjić was a member of the bronze medal winning Serbian team in water polo at the 2012 Summer Olympics.

See also
 Serbia men's Olympic water polo team records and statistics
 List of Olympic medalists in water polo (men)

References

External links

 

1992 births
Living people
Sportspeople from Belgrade
Serbian male water polo players
Water polo drivers
Water polo players at the 2012 Summer Olympics
Medalists at the 2012 Summer Olympics
Olympic bronze medalists for Serbia in water polo
European champions for Serbia
Universiade medalists in water polo
Universiade gold medalists for Serbia
Medalists at the 2011 Summer Universiade
21st-century Serbian people